Chantell Skye Evans is an American cell biologist who is a professor at Duke University. Her research looks to understand the dynamical processes of mitochondria and their role in neurodegenerative disease. In 2022, Popular Science named her as one of their "Brilliant 10" U.S. scientists and engineers.

Early life and education 
Evans grew up in a small town in central Illinois, in a majority-white neighborhood. She was awarded a Gates Millennium Scholarship to pursue studies at university. Evans was an undergraduate student at the Southern Illinois University, where she studied chemistry was part of the Research Experiences for Undergraduates scheme, and spent her junior year in the laboratory of Punit Kohli. Evans moved to the University of Wisconsin–Madison to complete a doctorate in the lab of Edwin Chapman. Her doctoral research considered the regulation of Ca²⁺ in exocytosis. She moved to the University of Pennsylvania Perelman School of Medicine and joined Erika Holzbaur for postdoctoral research. In 2017, she was named a Howard Hughes Medical Institute Fellow.

Research and career 
Evans joined the faculty at Duke University in 2021.

Evans uses cell biology to understand how cells deal with malfunctioning mitochondria in neurons, a process known as mitophagy. Patients with Parkinson's disease typically show mutations on two proteins, PINK1 and Parkin. However, when these proteins are disabled in mice, the mice do not exhibit Parkinson's disease. Evans wondered whether mitochondra, the "powerhouse of the cell", may play a role in the development of the neurodegenerative disease. She uncovered that eradicating malfunctioning mitochondria is slower in neurons than it is in epithelial cells, which indicates that defective mitophagy in neurons contributes to neurodegeneration.

In 2022, Evans was named a Fellow of the Chan Zuckerberg Initiative Science Diversity Leadership program. Popular Science also named her as one of their "Brilliant 10" U.S. scientists and engineers who are succeeding in addressing key challenges in society.

Selected publications

References 

Living people
American women biologists
Cell biologists
Duke University faculty
University of Wisconsin–Madison alumni
Year of birth missing (living people)